The İğneada Floodplain Forests National Park, established on November 13, 2007, is a national park located within Kırklareli Province in Marmara Region of Turkey.

Streams running down from the Strandzha mountain range towards Black Sea formed alluvium on the shore, where floodplain occurred due to seasonal floodings.

The protected area is administered by the  Directorate-General of Nature Protection and National Parks of the Ministry of Environment and Forest.

The national park is a rare ecosystem, which consists of marsh, swamp, lakes and coastal sand dunes. The Strandzha mountain range is situated in the south and west. There are five lakes with aquatic plant. Lake Erikli covering    is a lagoon, which gets separated from the sea in the summer months as a result of drought. Lake Mert of  area is formed by Çavuşdere creek at its mouth. Lake Saka is a small lake of  situated in the south of the national park between the floodplain and the dunes. The sand dunes are situated on both sides of İğneada town. The dunes in the north stretch out from east of Lake Erikli to İğneada.

Ecosystem

Flora

The flora of dunes in the belt between the lakes, marsh and the sea are under protection by international agreement. The national park is also habitat for swamp and non-evergreen mixed wood. Vine species are the most distinct plants of the forest. Sprecies of European ash (Fraxinus excelsior), oak (Quercus), alder ((Alnus), beech (Fagaceae) and maple (Aceraceae) are trees found in the national park forest.

Fauna
Trout (Oncorhynchus), smelt (Osmeridae), grey mullet (Mugilidae) are fish species of the national park.
 
Birds like white-tailed eagle (Haliaeetus albicilla), European green woodpecker (Picus viridis), owl (Strigiformes), grey heron (Ardea cinerea), European cuckoo (Cuculus canorus), kingfisher (Coraciiformes), black stork (Ciconia nigra)) and hoopoe (Upupa epops) are observed in the area.
 
Among the mammals are wildcat (Felis silvestris), wild boar (Sus scrofa), hare (Lepus), European pine marten (Martes martes), European badger (Meles meles), grey wolf (Canis lupus), deer (Cervidae), fox (Vulpes vulpes), European otter (Lutra lutra), yellow-necked mouse (Apodemus flavicollis), weasel (Mustela), big-eared bat (Micronycteris), and variegated skunk (Mephitis mephitis).

As reptiles Hermann's tortoise (Testudo hermanni), southern crested newt (Triturus karelinii), lizard (Lacertilia), asp (Vipera aspis), earringed water snake (Acrochordidae) are found in the area.

Access
İğneada Floodplain Forests National Park can be reached by public transportation from Istanbul via Silivri, Çorlu, Lüleburgaz, Pınarhisar, Demirköy and İğneada. It is convenient to go from Istanbul over the motorway  via Saray, Vize and then Poyralı, Demirköy and İğneada by car.

See also
 Lake Saka Nature Reserve
 Acarlar Floodplain Forest

References

External links

Protected areas established in 2007
National parks of Turkey
Geography of Kırklareli Province
Forests of Turkey
Lakes of Turkey
Floodplains of Europe
Landforms of Kırklareli Province
Tourist attractions in Kırklareli Province
2007 establishments in Turkey
Demirköy District
Important Bird Areas of Turkey